Stutz is a surname that may refer to:

 Bruno Stutz (1938–2015), Swiss clown
 Carl Stutz (c. 1916–1996), American composer and radio announcer
 Garrett Stutz, (born 1990), American basketball player
 Geraldine Stutz (1924–2005), American business executive
 Harry C. Stutz (1876–1930), American automobile entrepreneur, engineer, innovator and founder of the company that he later renamed Stutz Motor Company
 Howard Stutz (1918–2010), Canadian geneticist and professor
 Jakob Stutz (1801–1877), Swiss writer
 Josef Stutz (1877–1948), Swiss politician
 Stanley Stutz (1920–1975), American basketball player

See also
Edmond de Stoutz (1920–1997), Swiss conductor